Andrew Johns (born 23 September 1973) is a male triathlete from the United Kingdom. Johns is a former European and World Cup Champion as well as a World Championship bronze medalist.

Born in Peterborough, Johns competed at the first Olympic triathlon at the 2000 Summer Olympics.  He was one of the three British triathletes, along with Sian Brice and Michelle Dillon, that did not finish the competition.

Four years later, at the 2004 Summer Olympics, Johns competed again. This time, he did finish. His time was 1:54:15.87 for sixteenth place.

References
British Olympic Association athlete profile

1973 births
Living people
Commonwealth Games competitors for England
English male triathletes
Olympic triathletes of Great Britain
Sportspeople from Peterborough
Triathletes at the 2000 Summer Olympics
Triathletes at the 2002 Commonwealth Games
Triathletes at the 2004 Summer Olympics